The Separate Corps of Gendarmes was the uniformed security police of the Imperial Russian Army in the Russian Empire during the 19th and early 20th centuries.  Its main responsibilities were law enforcement and state security.

The responsibilities of the Gendarmes also included the execution of court orders, pursuit of fugitives, riot control, and detainment of "unusual" criminals. Gendarmes could also be assigned to assist local police and officials.

Establishment
The precursors of the Corps were the Imperial Army Gendarmerie regiment (formed in 1815 and based on the Borisoglebsk Dragoon Regiment) and Gendarmerie units of the Separate Corps of the Internal Guards (raised 1811). Following the 1825 Decembrist revolt, the new Russian Emperor, Nicholas I, established the office of the Chief of Gendarmes in July 1826 and appointed General Count Alexander Benkendorf to it; all of the gendarmes were subordinate to the Chief. Benkendorf was also appointed executive director of the newly formed Third Section of the Imperial Chancellery although the office of the Head of the Third Section did not formally merge with that of the Chief of Gendarmes until 1839.

Organisation
In 1836, the Gendarmerie of the Internal Guards was transformed into the Separate Corps of Gendarmes, under the Chief of Gendarmes. The Commander of the Corps and Chief of Staff of the Corps were also Directors of the Third Section under the executive director. The Corps was divided into seven territorial Districts, six of them located in Russia and one in the Kingdom of Poland, each having a Directorate. The Main Directorate, along with additional Gubernial Directorates, was also created. The Army's Gendarmerie regiment joined the Corps in 1842.

As of 1867 statute, the Corps consisted of:

 Main Directorate
 Surveillance staff
 Caucasus, Warsaw and Siberia Districts
 Gubernial Directorates (56)
 Uyezd Directorates (50)
 Railroad Directorates
 St. Petersburg, Moscow and Warsaw divisions
 Mounted units (13)

Expanded role

In 1871, the Gendarmes acquired the right to investigate both political and criminal cases, as the judicial investigators were dismissed.

Only the most competent army officers holding noble ranks could be appointed to the Corps of Gendarmes. In August 1880, both the Third Section and the Separate Corps of Gendarmes came under the authority of the Minister of Internal Affairs, as proposed by Count Loris-Melikov. The Minister of Internal Affairs took up the office of Chief of Gendarmes, and the Commander of the Corps became his Deputy. Many Gendarme officers were transferred to the new Department of Police.

Following the 1902 assassination of MVD Minister Dmitry Sergeyevich Sipyagin, the state security authorities of the Gendarmerie Directorates was transferred to the Okhrana and counterintelligence units of the General Staff and the Department of Police.

Disbandment
During the February 1917 Russian Revolution, Gendarmes stationed at Kronstadt remained loyal to the tsarist regime, fired on demonstrators and were later imprisoned for trial. On  the Corps of Gendarmes was formally abolished by the order of the Provisional Committee of the State Duma, along with the regular tsarist police.

Directors
Alexander von Benckendorff (1826–1844, its founder and first chief)
Vasily Andreyevich Dolgorukov (?–?)
Aleksandr Potapov (1861–1864)
Pyotr Andreyevich Shuvalov (1866–?)
Alexander Drenteln (1878–1880)
Pyotr Dmitrievich Sviatopolk-Mirskii (1900–1905)

Ranks and uniforms

The Gendarmes used cavalry ranks of the Russian military ranks system introduced in 1826. Most branches of the Separate Corps wore light blue uniforms in contrast to the dark green of the regular army and police. Gendarmes of the Railroad Directorates were, however, distinguished by dark blue tunics.

Rank insignia 1884-1907
Commissioned officer ranks

Other ranks

See also
 Jailbirds of Kerensky
 Ministry of Police of Imperial Russia
 National Guard of Russia
 Police Department of Russia
 Internal Troops

References

Further reading
 Political police and political terrorism in Russia (second half of XIX – beginning of XX). Collection of documents. Compiled by V.I. Kochanov, N.N. Parfyonova, M.V. Sidorova, Ye. I. Sherbakova. Moscow, AIRO-XX (2000). .

External links
 Official history of the MVD of Russia: 1825–1856 1857–1879 1880–1904 1905–1916 

Branches of the secret services of the Russian Empire
Corps of the Russian Empire
Defunct law enforcement agencies of Russia
Defunct military provosts
Military units and formations disestablished in 1917
Military units and formations established in 1836
1836 establishments in the Russian Empire